
Gmina Turośń Kościelna is a rural gmina (administrative district) in Białystok County, Podlaskie Voivodeship, in north-eastern Poland.

Villages
Gmina Turośń Kościelna contains the villages and settlements of Baciuty, Baciuty-Kolonia, Barszczówka, Bojary, Borowskie Cibory, Borowskie Gziki, Borowskie Michały, Borowskie Olki, Borowskie Skórki, Borowskie Wypychy, Borowskie Żaki, Chodory, Czaczki Małe, Czaczki Wielkie, Dobrowoda, Dołki, Iwanówka, Juraszki, Lubejki, Markowszczyzna, Niecki, Niewodnica Korycka, Niewodnica Kościelna, Pomigacze, Stoczki, Tołcze, Topilec, Topilec-Kolonia, Trypucie, Turośń Dolna, Turośń Kościelna, Zalesiany and Zawady.

Neighbouring gminas
Gmina Turośń Kościelna is bordered by the gminas of Choroszcz, Juchnowiec Kościelny, Łapy and Suraż.

References
 Polish official population figures 2006

Turosn Koscielna
Białystok County